Oluwaseun Ewerogba "James" Akintunde (born 29 March 1996) is an English footballer who plays as a forward for League of Ireland side Bohemians.

Career
Akintunde was a Cambridge United youth graduate, and made his first team debut on 30 November 2013, coming on as a late substitute in a 1–0 FA Trophy away win against Salisbury City. On 29 August 2014 he was loaned to Histon until January.

In January 2015, after scoring six goals for Histon in all competitions, Akintunde returned to the U's. He made his professional debut on 14 February 2015, again from the bench in a 0–2 away loss against Plymouth Argyle. He played no games for Cambridge the following season, but did play out on loan at Brackley Town and Needham Market. Akintunde was released by Cambridge United at the end of the 2015–16 season.

Akintunde joined Chester for the 2016–17 season. He spent two full seasons at the Deva, scoring eleven times in sixty games, before joining Maidenhead United for 2018–19.
 Akintunde scored twice in 62 games before leaving the Magpies at the end of the 2019–20 season. Akintunde signed for League of Ireland Premier Division team Derry City on 24 July 2020. He scored on his debut against St Patrick's Athletic on 3 August. On 2 December 2022 Akintunde signed for Bohemians.

Career statistics

References

External links
Cambridge United official profile

James Akintunde at Aylesbury United

1996 births
Living people
English sportspeople of Nigerian descent
English footballers
Association football wingers
Southend United F.C. players
Cambridge United F.C. players
A.F.C. Sudbury players
Histon F.C. players
Brackley Town F.C. players
Needham Market F.C. players
Chester F.C. players
Maidenhead United F.C. players
Derry City F.C. players
Bohemian F.C. players
English Football League players
National League (English football) players
Southern Football League players
Isthmian League players
League of Ireland players